Modibbo Adama Federal University of Technology, Yola is a public research university in Girei, a town in  Adamawa State, Northeastern Nigeria. It is one of the four federal technology universities established with the sole purpose of advancing science-based research. The university has been accredited by the National Universities Commission. The university offers associate's, bachelor's, master's, and PhD degrees. The Vice Chancellor is Abdullahi Liman Tukur.

In 1984, the University was merged to University of Maiduguri , and it  became the  Modibbo Adama Campus (MACUM). Federal University of Technology, Yola. Once again, the university was demerged and given complete autonomy in 1988. The university's name was changed to Modibbo Adama University of Technology, (MAUTECH) Yola in 2011 with the approval of the then- current President and Commander in Chief, Dr. Goodluck Ebele Jonathan, GCFR, and it became effective on October 1st of that year.

The university offers undergraduate and graduate degrees in seven schools, including the School of Agriculture and Agricultural Technology (SAAT), the School of Environmental Science (SES), the School of Management and Information Technology (SMIT), the School of Pure and Applied Sciences (SPAS), the School of Engineering and Engineering Technology (SEET), the School of Technology and Science Education (STSE), and the School of Postgraduate Studies (SPGS).

The university offers degree programs through its centers for distance learning in addition to traditional full-time programs. Additionally, it offers Diploma and Certificate programs in over twenty programs through its Consultancy Services Unit. The university has focused mostly on teaching and research in the fields of science and technology. These have drawn a number of partnerships and collaborations with foreign universities and corporate entities, Government and non- governmental organizations to the university.

Courses and programmes 
ADMINISTRATION

Accounting

Banking and Finance

Business Management

Management

Information Management Technology

EDUCATION

Agricultural Education

Biology Education

Business Education

Chemistry Education

Construction Technology Education

Electrical and Electronics Technology Education

Geography Education

Home Economics

Mathematics Education

Mechanical Technology Education

Physics Education

Statistics Education

SCIENCES

Biochemistry

Botany

Computer Science

Industrial Chemistry

Geology

Mathematics

Physics

Microbiology

Pure Chemistry

Statistics

Mathematics with Economics

Zoology

Biotechnology

AGRICULTURE

Agriculture

Forestry and Wildlife Management

Fisheries

Soil Science

ENVIRONMENTAL SCIENCE

Architecture

Building

Industrial Design

Surveying and Geo-Informatics

Urban and Regional Planning

SOCIAL SCIENCES

Economics

Operations Research

Geography

ENGINEERING

Agricultural Engineering

Chemical Engineering

Civil Engineering

Electrical and Electronic Engineering

Food Science Technology

Mechanical Engineering

Information Technology

See also
List of Tertiary Institutions in Adamawa State

References 

 
Federal universities of Nigeria
Technological universities in Nigeria
Education in Adamawa State